Burcu Özsoy (born in Gaziantep, Turkey, in 1976) is a Turkish scientist who works with sea ice remote sensing in Antarctica. Özsoy is head of the first Turkish polar research center, ITU PolReC.

Early life and education
Özsoy is a native of Turkey and graduated from Yıldız Technical University with degrees of Bachelor and Master in Geodesy-Photogrammetry Engineering. In 2001 she started serving as Research Assistant (RA) in Istanbul Technical University. In 2003 she joined the Remote Sensing and Geoinformatics Lab, Department of Geological Sciences at University of Texas at San Antonio (UTSA). Özsoy always had an interest in statistical mathematics and geo-physical sciences and combined both fields by becoming a remote sensing expert. In 2005, she worked on her PhD at the UTSA. During her work there, she met key U.S. and other international scientists and institutions, including those who worked at the NASA Goddard Space Flight Center. She was interested in Antarctic remote sensing and looked forward to the chance to hop onto an icebreaker to cruise to Antarctica and see, feel, smell, hear, and taste Antarctic sea ice and landscape for the first time. She traveled to Antarctica in 2006. Inspired by this experience she doubled her forces and filled an important knowledge gap in remote sensing of Antarctic sea ice with her Ph.D. thesis. In 2007, she established American Society of Photogrammetry and Remote Sensing (ASPRS) chapter in UTSA. In 2010 Özsoy earned her P.h.D. from UTSA.

Career and impact

While she was working on her Ph.D, she learned that communication across disciplines and across scientific knowledge levels is the key to make people understand new results and theories in the field of and the threats accompanied with climate change. Therefore, after having returned to Turkey in 2011, she worked hard against resistance and old-fashioned opinions to promote the importance of polar research in Turkey; from the 1st grade school kid to the well-established professor and up into the highest political levels. Her initiations also started public awareness about the importance of the Polar Regions. Many students that she has been giving lectures to, are now well aware of climate change and have done related researches for the first time in Turkey. She is the founder and director of Istanbul Technical University Polar Research Center (ITU PolReC) which is in charge of all polar sciences in Turkey. Its foundation is well in line with the scientifically rooted logical next step to contribute to Antarctic research with a Turkish research base in Antarctica for which she went back to Antarctica in March/April 2016. During that expedition, she was the deputy leader. She was also one of two women for the expedition and said that the two women scientists showed that Turkish women can accomplish anything. One of the projects she worked on during the expedition involved climate change. Also she was included Scientific Committee of International Circumpolar Observatory. She led first, second and third Turkish Antarctic Expeditions under the auspices of Presidency of Turkey and under the coordination of the Ministry of Industry and Technology and Istanbul Technical University (ITU) Polar Research Center (PolReC)

Awards and honours
 2006, November 10 She got second place at Student Papers/Presentations with the presentation named "Variability of Snow Depth on Sea Ice in Ross Region of Antarctic using AMSR-E/AQUA Geophysical  Products", at ASPRS-MAPPS Fall 2006 Conference
 2006, November 15 LRSG group exhibited our geospatial related works to hundreds of San Antonio school kids at the San Antonio GIS Day led by Ph D students Xianwei Wang and Burcu Özsoy.
 2007, November 16 ASPRS UTSA Chapter and LRSG exhibited our geospatial related works to hundreds of San Antonio school kids at the San Antonio GIS Day - Student Day. PhD student Burcu Özsoy led the effort with help from Newfel Mazari and Penny Wagner
 Burcu Özsoy awarded three IKNOS images from GeoEye Foundation to study Antarctic sea ice and Mt. Erebus volcano
 2009, November 19 Burcu Özsoy got first place at the ASPRS Mid-South Student Award for her presentation “Intercomparisons of Antarctic sea ice properties from ship observations, active and passive microwave satellite observations in the Bellingshausen Sea”, at the ASPRS/MAPPS Fall Conference
 2014, June Grant by The Scientific and Technological Research Council of Turkey

Selected works 
 Burcu Ozsoy-Cicek, H. Xie, S. F. Ackley, K. Ye, "Antarctic summer sea ice concentration and extent: comparison of ODEN 2006 ship observations, satellite passive microwave and NIC sea ice charts", The Cryosphere Discussion (TCD), 2009, s. 623–647, 
 B. Ozsoy-Cicek, S. Kern, S. F. Ackley, H. Xie, A. Tekeli, "Intercomparisons of Antarctic sea properties from ship observations, active and passive microwave satellite observations in the Bellingshausen Sea", Deep Sea Research, Vol. 58, No. 9-10, 2011, s. 1092-1111, Elsevier
 B. Ozsoy-Cicek, "About oil spill detection from RADARSAT-1 Synthetic Aperture Radar imagery at Northern entry of Bosporus Strait, Turkey", Fresenius Environmental Bulletin, Vol. 23, No. 11a, 11/2014, s. 2909-2918, 
 Steer, A., Heil, P., Watson, C., Massom R. A., Lieser J. L., Cicek B. Ö. (2016) Estimating small-scale snow depth and ice thickness from total freeboard for East Antarctic sea ice, Deep Sea Research Part II: Topical Studies in Oceanography, 
 Kern, S., B. Ozsoy-Cicek, and A. P. Worby. (2016) Antarctic sea-ice thickness retrieval from ICESat: Inter-comparison of different approaches, Rem. Sens., 8(7), 538, 
 Kern, S., and B. Ozsoy-Cicek (2016) Satellite remote sensing of snow depth on Antarctic sea ice: An inter-comparison of two empirical approaches, Rem. Sens., 8(6), 450, 
 Ozsoy-Cicek, B., S.F Ackley, H Xie, D. Yie, J. Zwally, (2013). Antarctic sea ice thickness from Altimetry: Algorithms based on in situ surface elevation and thickness values. Journal of Geophysical Research – Oceans, Vol, 118, 3807-3822 , 2013
 Kern, S., B. Ozsoy-Cicek, S. Willmess, M. Nicolaus, S.F Ackley, C. Haas, (2011). An intercomparison between AMSR-E snow depth and satellite C- and Ku-Band radar backscatter data for Antarctic sea ice, International Glaciological Society (IGS) – Annals of Glaciology, volume: 52, number: 57, 2011, pg: 279-290
 Ozsoy-Cicek, B., S. Kern, S.F Ackley, H Xie, A. E. Tekeli, (2011). Intercomparisons of Antarctic sea properties from ship observations, active and passive microwave satellite observations in the Bellingshausen Sea, Deep-Sea Research II (2011), volume: 58, number: 9-10, pages: 1092-1111

References

External links

 Burcu Özsoy on Istanbul Technical University
 ITU PolReC Official website
 

Living people
1976 births
People from Gaziantep
Yıldız Technical University alumni
Academic staff of Istanbul Technical University
Turkish women scientists
Women Antarctic scientists
University of Texas at San Antonio alumni